is a passenger railway station located in the city of Kōnan, Kōchi Prefecture, Japan.. It is operated by the third-sector Tosa Kuroshio Railway with the station number "GN36".

Lines
Only local trains stop at the station.

Layout
The station consists of a side platform serving a single elevated track. There is no station building, but an enclosed shelter is provided on the platform. Another waiting room has been set up under the elevated structure. Access to the platform is by a flight of steps. A bike shed is provided nearby.

Adjacent stations

Station mascot
Each station on the Asa Line features a cartoon mascot character designed by Takashi Yanase, a local cartoonist from Kōchi Prefecture. The mascot for Yoshikawa Station is an eel in human form named , so chosen because eels are a noted product of Yoshikawa.

History

Passenger statistics
In fiscal 2011, the station was used by an average of 22 passengers daily.

Surrounding area
The station is located in a rural area with few buildings nearby.

See also 
List of railway stations in Japan

References

External links

Railway stations in Kōchi Prefecture
Railway stations in Japan opened in 2002
Kōnan, Kōchi